Cortlandt Alley is an alley in Lower Manhattan, New York City, which is often used as a filming location. Filming is not allowed in many of New York City's alleys, so Cortlandt Alley appears in many movies and TV shows, including Crocodile Dundee, 9½ Weeks and Boardwalk Empire. As of 2019, film crews were working in the alley three to four times a week.

The alley runs north to south from Canal Street to Franklin Street for three blocks between Tribeca and Chinatown. Like Cortlandt Street in Manhattan's Financial District and Van Cortlandt Park in the Bronx, the alley was named after the Van Cortlandt family. It was first laid out in 1817.

Location scout Nick Carr says "it's a self-perpetuating fictional version of New York, the alley has become iconic. It's gotten to the point that we've seen alleys in so many movies and TV shows that actual New Yorkers think that they're all around us".

History
The commissioner's plan of 1811, regarded as the single most important document in New York City's development, was a major effort to optimize and maximize the city's real estate. The plan created 155 streets and 12 Avenues intersecting at right angles leaving out alleys by design. The plan gave the commission eminent domain: the power to force existing land owners to sell any land the commission needed in order to build their design. 

Roughly 40 percent of all existing buildings were destroyed to make way for the new grid. In return for their losses, the commission didn't place any alleys on the land that remained, so that the land owners could provide and profit from more housing and commercial units.

Today, most of the only remaining alleys left in New York City are located in lower Manhattan south of Canal Street. Cortland alley was laid out in 1817, six years after the commissioner's plan.

Filmmakers often use Cortlandt Alley as backdrop to shoot a murder scene, a street fight, an adrenaline-fueled police pursuit, and any crime-related scene. To make the alley seem even more dangerous and dingy and shady, film crews have sometimes pasted papers on the walls, staged bags of garbage on the sides, and purposely dirtied the environment.

Filming location
Notable films and television series include:
Men in Black
Teenage Mutant Ninja Turtles: Out of the Shadows
Highlander
Gotham
Kate & Leopold
Boardwalk Empire
9½ Weeks
Law & Order
NYPD Blue
The Smurfs
And Just Like That...

Music videos:
 Simba by J. Cole
on the street (with J. Cole) by j-hope of BTS
MAXIDENT trailer by Stray Kids

References 

Streets in Manhattan
Film location shooting
Chinatown, Manhattan
Tribeca